Tebekmakhi (Dargwa: Тӏебекмахьи) is a rural locality (a selo) and the administrative centre of Tebekmakhinsky Selsoviet, Akushinsky District, Republic of Dagestan, Russia. The population was 2,278 as of 2010. There are 19 streets.

Geography 
Tebekmakhi is located 18 km northwest of Akusha (the district's administrative centre) by road, on the Akusha River. Kurkabi is the nearest rural locality.

References 

Rural localities in Akushinsky District